The 1848 United States presidential election in Delaware took place on November 7, 1848, as part of the 1848 United States presidential election. Voters chose three representatives, or electors to the Electoral College, who voted for President and Vice President.

Delaware voted for the Whig candidate, Zachary Taylor, over Democratic candidate Lewis Cass. Taylor won the state by a narrow margin of 4.26%.

Results

See also
 United States presidential elections in Delaware

References

Delaware
1848
1848 Delaware elections